Ahmed (Doudou) Ahmedou (born 27 August 1964) is a retired Mauritanian international football player. He used to play for Club Deportivo Thader and the Mauritania national football team.

During March 2016, Ahmed travelled to Croatia on international duty with the University of Sussex. He performed well during his brief stay and scored twice in two nights.

On 5 March 2014, he made his international début for Mauritania in a 1–1 draw with Niger in Nouakchott.

References 

1993 births
Living people
Mauritanian footballers
Mauritania international footballers
Three Bridges F.C. players
Place of birth missing (living people)
Association football fullbacks